Dhod Assembly constituency is one of constituencies of Rajasthan Legislative Assembly in the Sikar (Lok Sabha constituency).

Dhod Constituency covers all voters from parts of Sikar tehsil, which include ILRC Dhod, ILRC Sihot Bari, ILRC Sihot Chhoti, ILRC Doojod, and Gothra Bhookran, Kudan and Raseedpura of ILRC Dadiya; and part of Danta Ramgarh tehsil, which includes Losal Municipal Board, Bhagatpura, Bheema, Jana, Sangalia and Khood of ILRC Losal.

References

See also 
 Member of the Legislative Assembly (India)

Sikar district
Assembly constituencies of Rajasthan